The Carolina Herald was the principal herald of the Province of Carolina.

Its first Herald was Lawrence Cromp, Esq., who was appointed by letters patent in 1705 by Anne, Queen of Great Britain and the Lords Proprietors of Carolina. He was also York Herald. Part of his duties were to invest the Carolina provincial nobility, with the Order of the Sun of Carolina and to register the Carolina nobility.

References
Hugh Brogan and Charles Mosley, American Presidential Families, Page 758  
L.G. Pine, Heraldry, Ancestry and Titles, Questions and Answers

External links
 

Officers of arms